Zé Ramalho is the debut album (if Paêbirú is not taken into account) by the artist of same name, released in 1978.

It features two great hits of his career: "Chão de Giz" and "Avôhai". Patrick Moraz, keyboardist of the band Yes, guest appeared in the track "Avôhai". The CD was re-released in 2003 with five bonus tracks.

Background 
The songs of the album were created during trips through the states of Paraíba and Pernambuco between 1975 and 1976, when Ramalho was studying medicine at the Federal University of Paraíba.

With these tracks, he left college and moved to Rio de Janeiro, where he approached several producers and businessmen to try and land a deal for his first solo album. However, he was rejected by all of them after showing them "Avôhai", "Vila do Sossego" and "Chão de Giz" until he met Jairo Pires, then president of CBS, via which the album was released.

Production, "Avôhai" and reception 

The album features many artists including  Sérgio Dias, Dominguinhos, Altamiro Carrilho, Bezerra da Silva, Paulo Moura and keyboardist Patrick Moraz of Yes fame, the latter on "Avôhai". Sion kept contact with Moraz, which is what allowed the opportunity for his guest appearance. He played a keyboard that Sion had rented from Lincoln Olivetti.

"Avôhai" was composed as a tribute to Ramalho's grandfather, who adopted him after his father died by drowning two years after he was born. Ramalho said that inspiration for the song came after an experience with psilocybin mushrooms in a friend's farm. He looked at the sky and saw the "shadow of a gigantic spaceship", and a voice whispered "Avôhai" in his ear. He was in that farm for a college assignment. "Avôhai" comes from the words "Avô" (grandfather) and "Pai" (father). The song marked the first time he listened to his own work on the radio, when he was in a taxi heading to Galeão Airport in order to catch a plane for another leg of the album's promotional tour.

The album didn't receive much attention from the press, and when it did, it received heavy criticism; Ramalho believes critics simply had a prejudice against his Northeastern origins. A story published by Folha de S.Paulo in 1980, however, says critics were positive about the album and that some established a comparison between Ramalho and Bob Dylan. About this, in the same story, Ramalho said they did so because "they didn't know Otacílio Batista" - one of Brazil's greatest repentists, according to him.

In 2014, "Chão de Giz" was listed by ECAD as the tenth song with most live cover versions performed in that year.

Track listing

Remastered version 
Apart from all original tracks, the remastered version contains the following bonus tracks, all of them being acoustic guitar & voice versions:

Personnel 
 Zé Ramalho – Acoustic guitar, viola, lead vocals.
 Chico Julien — bass
 Chico Batera — drums
 Gian Carlos Pareschini – Violin on "Vila do Sossego
 Lula Côrtes – Electric tricordia on "A Noite Preta"
 Lourenço Baeta – Flute on "Voa, Voa"
 Odaires Rosangela – Choir on "Voa, Voa"
 Sergio Dias Baptista - Lead Guitar on "A Danca das Borboletas"
 Patrick Moraz; Synthesizers on "Avôhai"

References 

Zé Ramalho albums
1978 debut albums
Epic Records albums